Li Min is the name of:

Emperor Zhaozong of Tang (867–904), Tang dynasty emperor who briefly used the name Li Min from 888 to 889
Li Min (daughter of Mao Zedong) (born 1936), daughter of Chinese leader Mao Zedong
Li Min (synchronised swimmer) (born 1976), Chinese synchronized swimmer
Min Li Marti (born 1974), Swiss politician, publisher, sociologist and historian